Van Landingham is a Dutch surname. Notable people with the surname include:

J. C. Van Landingham, American stock car racing driver
Marian Van Landingham (born 1937), American politician and artist
William Van Landingham (born 1970), American baseball player

Surnames of Dutch origin